St. Elizabeth's may refer to:

 St. Elizabeth's Church (disambiguation)
 St. Elizabeth's F.C. Football club based in Dundonald, Northern Ireland
 St. Elizabeth's flood (disambiguation), two separate floods occurring in the 15th century Low Countries
 St. Elizabeths Hospital, Washington, D.C., United States, listed on the NRHP in Washington, D.C.
 St. Elizabeth's Medical Center (Boston), Massachusetts, United States

See also
 Saint Elizabeth (disambiguation)